Seventy Two Changes was a fashion brand by New York-based fashion company Truth & Pride and Taiwanese singer Jolin Tsai. The brand was founded in 2009 in New York City, United States and manufactured apparel and fashion accessories. The brand has been closed down in 2011 due to the differences in vision between shareholders in mainland China and United States.

History
As CEO and founder of New York-based fashion company Truth & Pride, Ken Erman continued to evolve and expand global reach through his collaboration with Taiwanese singer Jolin Tsai. Erman grew up around fashion. His family owns a large apparel company based out of Pennsylvania called Notations, and he spent several years cultivating an in-depth knowledge of the apparel business. In 2003, he collaborated with American singer Gwen Stefani and created the fashion brand L.A.M.B. In 2008, Erman and Brenda Lin, the president of Truth & Pride, met with Jolin Tsai in Taiwan and they shared the same creative vision.

In February 2009, Tsai and Erman announced the release of a new fashion brand named after Tsai's 2003 album, Magic (also known as See My 72 Changes literally in Chinese), at SoHo Showroom in Manhattan, New York City. The brand was debuted in July 2009 at Nordstrom of 12 cities in the United States, including New York City, San Francisco, and Scottsdale. In July 2009, Tsai made a guest appearance in connection with the Fall 2009 collection of her fashion brand at Nordstrom at the Westfield San Francisco Centre. In August 2009, the brand was introduced by Taiwanese department store Level 6ix into Taiwan, and the brand planned to introduced the brand into other areas, including China, Singapore, and Malaysia.

In February 2010, Tsai made a second public appearance in collection with the Fall 2010 collection of the brand at SoHo Showroom in Manhattan. In the same month, the brand opened its first boutique at Times Square in Shanghai, China, and it was sold in over 30 stores in North America and Asia. Seventy Two Changes sales have expanded from $100 million in 2009 to a predicted $400 million in 2010. In the following year, Tsai's contract with Truth & Pride ended, but Tsai had no intention to renew the agreement. Due to the differences in vision between shareholders of mainland China and United States, Tsai chose to quit the business and would like to start an online fashion store.

References

External links 
  (closed)
 

Clothing brands of the United States
Defunct brands
Jolin Tsai
Products introduced in 2009
Street fashion